Reguiba District is a district of El Oued Province, Algeria. At the 2008 census, it had a population of 45,539.

Communes

Reguiba District consists of two communes:
Reguiba
Hamraia

References

Districts of El Oued Province